Lenny Janko (born 5 February 2002) is a Swiss professional footballer who plays as a right-back for Swiss club Zürich U21.

Personal life
Janko was born in Switzerland to a Gambian father and an Italian mother. He is the brother of fellow professional footballer Saidy Janko.

Career statistics

Club

Notes

References

2002 births
Footballers from Zürich
Swiss people of Gambian descent
Swiss people of Italian descent
Living people
Swiss men's footballers
Association football defenders
FC Zürich players
Swiss Super League players
Swiss Promotion League players